Alejandro Lecot (born 22 December 1962) is an Argentine freestyle swimmer. He competed in two events at the 1984 Summer Olympics.

References

External links
 

1962 births
Living people
Argentine male freestyle swimmers
Olympic swimmers of Argentina
Swimmers at the 1984 Summer Olympics
Pan American Games competitors for Argentina
Swimmers at the 1979 Pan American Games
Swimmers at the 1983 Pan American Games
Place of birth missing (living people)
20th-century Argentine people